Catherine of Saxony (Katharina von Sachsen; 24 July 1468 – 10 February 1524), a member of the House of Wettin, was the second wife of Sigismund, Archduke of Austria and Regent of Tyrol.

Life
Born in Grimma, Catherine was the eldest child of Duke Albert III of Saxony and his wife, the Bohemian princess Sidonie of Poděbrady. Her paternal grandparents were Elector Frederick III of Saxony and Margaret of Austria, daughter of the Habsburg duke Ernest the Iron. Her maternal grandparents were King George of Poděbrady and his first wife Kunigunde of Sternberg. Catherine had three surviving brothers  George, Henry and  Frederick.

At the age of 16, in 1484 at the Innsbruck court, Catherine became the second wife of Archduke Sigismund, who was already 56 years old and regarded as senile. The archduke had previously been married to Princess Eleanor of Scotland, who had left him no surviving children. Likewise, the marriage of Catherine and Sigismund remained childless. Catherine played little part in the politics of Tyrol; moreover, a former lover of Sigismund intrigued against the young bride and falsely claimed in 1487 that Catherine was trying to poison her husband. As the political style of the archduke was no longer tenable, he was gradually losing control over his Tyrolean possessions to his cousin Emperor Frederick III. Constant quarrels with local nobles followed due to the newly introduced limitations Sigismund made. By his resignation in 1490, his wife Catherine had significantly less budget than before. In 1496 Sigismund died.

Soon after the archduke's death, in 1496/97, Catherine married the Welf duke Eric I of Brunswick-Lüneburg, ruler over the Principality of Calenberg. The marriage produced one short-lived daughter, Anna Maria. Catherine died in 1524 and was buried in St. Blaise's Church, Münden; her tombstone was created by Loy Hering. Duke Eric remarried Elisabeth of Brandenburg and had surviving children.

Ancestry

References

1468 births
1524 deaths
House of Wettin
Remarried royal consorts
Austrian royal consorts
Albertine branch
Daughters of monarchs